The Pembroke Friends Meetinghouse is a historic Quaker church at Washington Street and Schoosett Street in Pembroke, Plymouth County, Massachusetts.

The meeting house was built in 1706 by Robert Barker with later 19th-century additions.  It is one of the oldest Quaker meetinghouses in the United States.  This meetinghouse was used by local Quakers from 1706 until 1876 when the meetinghouse was closed and its members transferred to meetings in either Sandwich or New Bedford.  Today the Meetinghouse is owned by the Pembroke Historical Society and has seen occasional use by area Quakers.

The building was listed on the National Register of Historic Places in 2006.

See also
National Register of Historic Places listings in Plymouth County, Massachusetts
New Bedford Meeting House
Swansea Friends Meetinghouse and Cemetery, a c. 1703 Quaker meeting house in Somerset, Massachusetts

References

External links
Pembroke Historical Society

Churches completed in 1706
Churches on the National Register of Historic Places in Massachusetts
National Register of Historic Places in Plymouth County, Massachusetts
Quaker meeting houses in Massachusetts
Churches in Plymouth County, Massachusetts
Pembroke, Massachusetts
18th-century Quaker meeting houses
1706 establishments in Massachusetts